Kim Clijsters and Eva Dyrberg were the defending champions, but they did not compete in the Junior's this year.

First seeds Dája Bedáňová and Iroda Tulyaganova won in the final, 6–3, 6–4, against unseeded Russians Galina Fokina and Lina Krasnoroutskaya.

Seeds

Draw

Finals

Top half

Bottom half

References
Main Draw

Girls' Doubles
US Open, 1999 Girls' Doubles